Mark Boyd may refer to:

 Mark Boyd (footballer) (born 1981), English football midfielder
 Mark Boyd (author) (1805–1879), English author
 Mark Alexander Boyd (1562–1601), Scottish poet and soldier of fortune
 Mark Frederick Boyd (1889–1968), American malariologist and writer